7 Draconis, also named Tianyi , is a single star in the northern circumpolar constellation of Draco. It is visible to the naked eye as a faint orange-hued star with a stellar classification of 5.43.

This is an evolved giant star with a stellar classification of K5 III. At its estimated distance, this yields a physical size of about 67 times the radius of the Sun. It is radiating about 1,024 times the Sun's luminosity from its enlarged photosphere at an effective temperature of 3,945 K.

Nomenclature 

7 Draconis is the star's Flamsteed designation.

The star bore the traditional Chinese name of Tianyi, from 天乙 (Tiān Yǐ) or 天一 (Tiān Yī, the Celestial Great One), a deity in Taoism. In 2016, the International Astronomical Union organized a Working Group on Star Names (WGSN) to catalogue and standardize proper names for stars. The WGSN approved the name Tianyi for this star on 30 June 2017 and it is now so entered on the List of IAU-approved Star Names.

References

K-type giants
Draco (constellation)
Draconis, 07
111335
62423
4863
Tianyi